Fred Miller may refer to:

Sports

American football
Fred Miller (American football, born 1906) (1906–1954), American football tackle for University of Notre Dame, heir to Miller Brewing Company
Fred Miller (American football, born 1931), American football tackle for the Washington Redskins
Fred Miller (American football, born 1973), American football tackle for the St. Louis Rams, Tennessee Titans, Chicago Bears
Fred Miller (defensive lineman) (1940-2023), American football defensive tackle for the Baltimore Colts

Other sports
Fred Miller (baseball) (1886–1953), American baseball pitcher
Fred Miller (rugby player) (1873–?), Wales international rugby player
Fred Miller (sailor), American sailor competed in the 1961 Finn Gold Cup

Journalists
Fred Miller (British journalist) (1863–1924), editor of The Daily Telegraph
Fred Miller (New Zealand journalist) (1904–1996), New Zealand journalist, goldminer, historian, poet and community worker

Other fields
Fred Miller (Australian politician) (1926–1992), member of the New South Wales Legislative Assembly
Fred Miller (Michigan politician), represented Michigan's 31st House of Representatives district 2005–2010
Fred Miller (philosopher), Objectivist philosopher
Fred Miller (producer) (born 1943), executive producer of For All Mankind (1989)
Fred E. Miller (1868–1936), photographer
Fred J. Miller (1857–1939), American mechanical and industrial engineer
Frederick Miller (paediatrician) (1911-1996), British

See also
Frederick Miller (disambiguation)
Freddie Miller (disambiguation)